Ditavan is a village in the Ijevan Municipality of the Tavush Province of Armenia.

Toponymy 
The village was previously was located within the former  and was known as Revazlu or Revaz. It was renamed Ditavan on May 25, 1967.

References

External links 

Populated places in Tavush Province